Kendema was a town of ancient Lycia.

Its site is tentatively located near Gödeme, Asiatic Turkey.

References

Populated places in ancient Lycia
Former populated places in Turkey